She Remembers, He Forgets is a 2015 Hong Kong drama film produced by Saville Chan and directed by Adam Wong and starring Miriam Yeung. It was released on 5 November 2015.

Cast
Miriam Yeung
Jan Lamb
Cecilia So (蘇麗珊)
Ng Siu Hin (吳肇軒)
Yau Hawk Sau (游學修)
Ranya Lee (李敏)
Gill Mohindepaul Singh

Release
The film was one of two opening films at the 2015 Hong Kong Asian Film Festival.

Reception
The film grossed  on its opening weekend, behind Spectre and Our Times.

Cecilia So was nominated for Best New Performer at the 52nd Golden Horse Film Awards.

References

External links

Hong Kong drama films
2015 drama films
2015 films
2010s Cantonese-language films
2010s Hong Kong films